Veronica is a 2017 Spanish supernatural horror film directed by Paco Plaza which stars Sandra Escacena alongside Claudia Placer, Bruna González, Iván Chavero and Ana Torrent.

It is loosely based on true events from the 1991 Vallecas case where Estefanía Gutiérrez Lázaro died mysteriously after she used a ouija board.

Plot
The film opens in 1991 in medias res, with emergency services responding to a call from a young girl. She sounds panicked and screams about something coming to get her brother before the call cuts off.

The film goes back in time three days. Verónica is a 15-year-old girl living with her mother and three young siblings in an apartment in the working-class district of Vallecas, Madrid. Their father recently died and their mother works long hours at a bar to support the family, leaving Verónica in charge of her younger siblings: twins Lucia and Irene, and Antoñito. On the day of the solar eclipse, her teacher explains how some ancient cultures used eclipses to stage human sacrifices and summon dark spirits.

Verónica and her friends Rosa and Diana go into the basement to conduct a séance using a Ouija board. Verónica wants to reach out to her late father, and Diana her late boyfriend, who died in a motorcycle accident. Rosa and Diana pull their hands back when the glass cup becomes too hot. Verónica's hand remains on it, and at the moment of the eclipse, the cup shatters, cutting her finger and dripping blood onto the board. Verónica becomes unresponsive, whispering something repeatedly, then lets out a demonic scream. She wakes in the school nurse's office, who tells her she probably passed out from iron deficiency.

Verónica begins experiencing paranormal occurrences and her friends avoid her. Looking for answers, she goes back to the school basement and finds the school's elderly blind nun whom the students call "Sister Death." The nun explains that the séance attached a dark spirit to her and tries to compel the spirit to leave, but nothing happens.

Verónica draws protective Viking symbols for the kids, only for the demon to destroy them. She tries to help Lucia when the spirit chokes her, but Lucia says it was Verónica who was choking her. Verónica wakes up to find that she's on her first period. As she scrubs her mattress, she finds burn marks on the underside. She also finds on each of the kids' mattresses a large burn mark in the shape of a human body. Sister Death tells Verónica that she used to see dark spirits when she was younger, and intentionally blinded herself in an unsuccessful attempt to stop the visions. Verónica can force the spirits to leave by doing right what she did wrong as it is important to say goodbye to the spirit at the end of a séance. Verónica asks Rosa and Diana to hold another séance, but they refuse. Rosa reveals that at the séance, Verónica whispered that she herself would die in five days.

Desperate, Verónica decides to hold the séance with her siblings. She has Antoñito draw the protective symbols on the walls, but he flips to the wrong page and instead draws symbols of invocation. When she tells the spirit to say goodbye, it refuses. She calls the police and escapes with her siblings. However, she sees that she is not actually holding Antoñito but had imagined it. Her brother is actually hiding in a closet. She finds him but he won't go with her. Verónica looks at herself in the mirror and sees the demon, realizing she has been possessed by the demon the entire time, and had been harming her siblings under its control. She attempts to end the possession by slitting her own throat but is prevented by the demon. The police enter to find her being attacked by an invisible force and passing out. The medics carry her and Antoñito out while a shaken detective observes the scene. As the detective watches a photograph of Verónica suddenly catch fire, he is informed that she has died. 

Five years later in 1996, he reports of unexplained paranormal activity having occurred in Madrid. It is explained that the movie is based on the true events of the first police report in Spain where a police officer certifies having witnessed paranormal activity.

Cast

Inspiration
The film was inspired when Estefanía Gutiérrez Lázaro (1973–1991) reportedly suffered hallucinations and seizures after performing the séance at a school in Madrid to try to contact her friend's deceased boyfriend who had died six months earlier. Her exact cause of death is a mystery. Her house allegedly became haunted after her death according to the British magazine NME. The American magazine Newsweek, referenced by NME, is more cautious and while acknowledging that the case is real, likens the event to the similar pop-culture phenomenon and urban legend The Amityville Horror. In the same magazine, director Paco Plaza says that he didn't feel bound to portray the real events, clarifying "...the whole story of Veronica and the sisters and Antoñito, this little Marlon Brando with glasses, it’s all a vision."

Production 
The screenplay was penned by Paco Plaza alongside Fernando Navarro. The film was produced by Apache Films alongside El Expediente La Película AIE, with the participation of RTVE and support from ICAA. The score was composed by Eugenio Mira, credited under the pseudonym Chucky Namanera.

Release
Verónica originally released on 25 August 2017 in Spain. In addition, the film was released in eight other countries between the months of December 2017 up until February 2018.

The film was selected for the lineup of the 2017 Toronto International Film Festival's Contemporary World Cinema section.

Reception

Box office 
In Spain the film grossed $4,212,203, and $1,910,886 in other territories, for a worldwide total of $6,123,089.

Critical response 
The review aggregator Rotten Tomatoes reported an 88% approval rating from 33 critic reviews. The website's critical consensus reads, "A scarily effective horror outing, Veronica proves it doesn't take fancy or exotic ingredients to craft skin-crawling genre thrills."

Jonathan Holland from The Hollywood Reporter gives a negative review of the film and wrote "The real horror in Veronica is not in the CGI visuals, or in Pablo Rosso's frantic cinematography, or in the aural bombardment of sound effects and music; it’s in the relationship between the children". Overall though he sums up his film review with "Thick on chills, thin on psychology."

Shortly after the release of Verónica on Netflix Jordan Crucchoila of Vulture countered other reviewers who believe that Verónica is the scariest movie on Netflix "In our estimation, Veronica is not that scary. It’s a worthy effort, but as far as witch-board movies go, you’ll get more out of Ouija 2: Origin of Evil.", but overall still believes that the film has "some great set-piece scares, and the movie’s most disturbing moment is pretty damn good." Ed Potton of The Times does not believe that the film is good and gave the film a 2 out of 5, and wrote "A considerable buzz online suggested that this Spanish horror might arrest the recent run of iffy Netflix movies. Sadly, it doesn't." Dennis Harvey of Variety, wrote that the film's ideas "aren’t ultimately original enough or its scares potent enough to suggest Plaza wouldn’t benefit from trying his directorial hand at someone else’s screenplay." Paul Tassi from Forbes magazine wrote "If I was scoring the movie myself I’d probably give it a 6 out of 10, “fresh,” but not exactly stunning."

Accolades 

|-
| align = "center" rowspan="21" |2018
| rowspan="4" | 73rd CEC Medals
|Best Editing
|Martí Roca
|
| rowspan="4" style="text-align:center;" |
|-
|Best New Actress
|Sandra Escacena
|
|-
|Best Original Screenplay
|Paco Plaza, Fernando Navarro
| 
|-
|Best Score
|Eugenio Mira
| 
|-
| rowspan="6" |5th Feroz Awards
|Best Director
|Paco Plaza
|
| rowspan="6" style="text-align:center;" |
|-
|colspan = "2" | Best Drama Film
|
|-
|Best Original Score
|Eugenio Mira
|
|-
|Best Trailer
|Rafa Martínez
|
|-
|Best Actress in a Leading Role
|Sandra Escacena
|
|-
|Best Screenplay
|Paco Plaza, Fernando Navarro
|
|-
| rowspan="7" |32nd Goya Awards
|Best Film
|Expediente La Película A.I.E., Apaches Entertainment
|
| rowspan="7" style="text-align:center;" |
|-
|Best Director
|Paco Plaza
|
|-
|Best Original Screenplay
|Paco Plaza, Fernando Navarro
|
|-
|Best Original Score
|Eugenio Mira
|
|-
|Best New Actress
|Sandra Escacena
|
|-
|Best Sound
|Aitor Berenguer, Gabriel Gutiérrez, Nicolas de Poulpiquet
|
|-
|Best Special Effects
|Raúl Romanillos, David Heras
|
|-
|27th Actors and Actresses Union Awards
|Best New Actress
|Sandra Escacena
|
| style="text-align:center;" | 
|-
|5th Platino Awards
|Best Sound
|Aitor Berenguer, Gabriel Gutiérrez, Nicolas de Poulpiquet
|
| style="text-align:center;" |
|-
| rowspan="2" |Turia Awards
|Special Award
|Paco Plaza
|
| rowspan="2" style="text-align:center;" |
|-
|Best New Actress
|Sandra Escacena
|
|-
| rowspan="2" |2019
|CinEuphoria Awards
|Best Sound/Sound Effects - International Competition
|
|
| style="text-align:center;" |
|-
|Fangoria Chainsaw Awards
|Best Streaming Premiere Film
|Paco Plaza
|
| style="text-align:center;" |
|}

Prequel 
In March 2022, Netflix announced the development of a prequel film titled Sister Death, directed by Paco Plaza and written by Jorge Guerricaechevarría.

See also
 List of Spanish films of 2017
 List of films featuring eclipses

References

External links
 
 The true story behind 'Veronica', the scariest movie of all time!

2017 films
2017 horror films
Spanish horror films
2010s Spanish-language films
Spanish supernatural horror films
Demons in film
Films set in 1991
Films set in 1996
Films set in Madrid
Films shot in Madrid
Films directed by Paco Plaza
Horror films based on actual events
Spanish films based on actual events
Apache Films films
2010s Spanish films